North Shore Ward is an Auckland Council ward that elects two councillors and covers the Devonport-Takapuna and Kaipātiki Local Boards. The two councillors are currently Richard Hills and Chris Darby.

Demographics

North Shore ward had a population of 146,241 at the 2018 New Zealand census, an increase of 8,280 people (6.0%) since the 2013 census, and an increase of 14,457 people (11.0%) since the 2006 census. There were 49,671 households, comprising 71,268 males and 74,976 females, giving a sex ratio of 0.95 males per female. The median age was 36.2 years (compared with 37.4 years nationally), with 26,838 people (18.4%) aged under 15 years, 31,644 (21.6%) aged 15 to 29, 68,076 (46.6%) aged 30 to 64, and 19,680 (13.5%) aged 65 or older.

Ethnicities were 62.8% European/Pākehā, 7.4% Māori, 4.7% Pacific peoples, 30.3% Asian, and 4.1% other ethnicities. People may identify with more than one ethnicity.

The percentage of people born overseas was 44.5, compared with 27.1% nationally.

Although some people chose not to answer the census's question about religious affiliation, 50.1% had no religion, 36.3% were Christian, 0.3% had Māori religious beliefs, 2.5% were Hindu, 1.5% were Muslim, 1.9% were Buddhist and 2.2% had other religions.

Of those at least 15 years old, 42,852 (35.9%) people had a bachelor's or higher degree, and 11,238 (9.4%) people had no formal qualifications. The median income was $38,000, compared with $31,800 nationally. 27,663 people (23.2%) earned over $70,000 compared to 17.2% nationally. The employment status of those at least 15 was that 62,802 (52.6%) people were employed full-time, 17,208 (14.4%) were part-time, and 3,942 (3.3%) were unemployed.

Councillors

Election Results
Election Results for the North Shore Ward:

2022 Election Results

2019 Election Results

References

Wards of the Auckland Region